We've Got a Live One Here! is an album by American rock band Commander Cody and His Lost Planet Airmen.  Recorded live in England in January and February 1976, it was released later that year as a two-disc LP.  The group's second live album, and seventh album overall, it reached #170 on the Billboard 200 sales chart.

Critical reception 
On AllMusic, Jana Pendragon wrote, "Always extraordinary, the era of Commander Cody & His Lost Planet Airmen was a special moment in time that created a place for hipsters, cosmic cowboys, rednecks, and the working class to all come together and enjoy some real American music. Never will there be another band like this one or recordings like the ones they made between 1971 and 1976"

In All About Jazz, C. Michael Bailey said, "The music they played was plainly Western swing – a musically alchemic concoction made up of equal parts country, western, blues, big band jazz, whiskey and reefer.... Like many other "American roots" musics, Western swing enjoyed a renewed interest in the 1970s and there were no better providers than Commander Cody and his Lost Planet Airmen."

When the album was released, Cash Box magazine wrote, "Commander Cody and His Lost Planet Airmen were pioneers of progressive country. This package reflects the depth of understanding and the group's interpretation of the sound that has become the "in" thing."

Track listing 
Side A
"One of Those Nights" (George Frayne, Billy C. Farlow, Bill Kirchen) – 2:10
"Semi Truck" (Farlow, Kirchen) – 2:21
"Smoke! Smoke! Smoke!" (Merle Travis, Tex Williams) – 3:43
"Big Mammau" (Link Davis) – 3:40
"San Antonio Rose" (Bob Willis) – 5:10
Side B
"18 Wheels" (Norton Buffalo) – 3:29
"Mama Hated Diesels" (Kevin "Blackie" Farrell) – 4:46
"Lookin' at the World Through a Windshield" (Jerry Chesnut, Mike Hoyer) – 2:09
"My Window Faces the South" (Abner Silver, Jerry Livingston, Mitchell Parish) – 1:52
"Milk Cow Blues" (Kokomo Arnold) – 4:07
Side C
"It Should've Been Me" (Eddie Curtis) – 2:09
"Back to Tennessee" (Frayne, Farlow) – 3:55
"Seeds and Stems" (Frayne, Farlow) – 3:35
"Rock  That Boogie" (Frayne, Farlow) – 2:43
"Riot in Cell Block Number 9" (Jerry Leiber, Mike Stoller) – 3:45
Side D
"Don't Let Go" (Jesse Stone) – 2:58
"Too Much Fun" (Kirchen, Farlow) – 3:24
"Hot Rod Lincoln" (Charlie Ryan, W.S. Stevenson) – 4:25
"Lost in the Ozone" (Farlow) – 2:42

Personnel 
Commander Cody and His Lost Planet Airmen
Commander Cody (George Frayne) – piano, vocals
Billy C. Farlow – vocals
Bill Kirchen – guitar, trombone, vocals
Rick Higginbotham – guitar
Bobby Black – pedal steel guitar
Andy Stein – fiddle, tenor saxophone
Norton Buffalo – harmonica, trombone, vocals
Bruce Barlow – bass guitar,vocals
Lance Dickerson – drums, vocals
Production
Produced by Tom Anderson
Co-production: Bill Kirchen, Rick Higginbotham
Recording and remix engineering: Tom Anderson
Mixing assistance: Rich Ehrman
Mastering: George Horn
Art direction: Ed Thrasher
Design, illustration: John Van Hamersveld

References 

Commander Cody and His Lost Planet Airmen albums
Warner Records live albums
1976 live albums